Harkat-ul-Jihad-al-Islami (Ḥarkat al-Jihād al-Islāmiyah, meaning "Islamic Jihad Movement", HuJI) is a Pakistani Islamic fundamentalist Jihadist organisation affiliated with Al-Qaeda and Taliban. Which aims to spread Radical Islamist ideology to liberate the rest of Islamic lands from the clutches of the enemies of Islam.

It has been the most active in the South Asian countries of Pakistan, Bangladesh and India since the early 1990s. The militant organisation has been designated as a terrorist group by India, Israel, New Zealand, United Kingdom, United States and its Bangladesh branch was banned in Bangladesh in 2005.

The operational commander of HuJI, Ilyas Kashmiri, was killed in a US drone strike in South Waziristan on 4 June 2011. He was linked to the 13 February 2010 bombing of a German bakery in Pune. A statement was released soon after the attack which claimed to be from Kashmiri; it threatened other cities and major sporting events in India. A local Taliban commander named Shah Sahib was named as Kashmiri's successor.

History
HuJI or HJI was formed in 1984, during the Soviet–Afghan War, by Fazlur Rehman Khalil and Qari Saifullah Akhtar. Khalil later broke away to form his own group, Harkat-ul-Ansar (HuA), which became the most feared militant organisation in Kashmir. This group would later re-form as Harkat-ul-Mujahideen (HuM), when HuA was banned by the United States in 1997.

HuJI first limited its operations in Afghanistan to defeat the Communists, but after the Soviets retreated, the organisation exported jihad to the Indian state of Jammu and Kashmir. HuJI's influence expanded into Bangladesh when the Bangladesh unit was established in 1992, with direct assistance from Osama bin Laden.

Ideology
The organisation along with other jihadists groups such as Harkat-ul-Mujahideen, Jaish-e-Mohammed, Al-Qaeda & Lashkar-e-Taiba had similar motivations and goals.Harkat-ul-Jihad al-Islami and Harkat-ul-Mujahideen were both strongly backed by the Taliban,Al-Qaeda & therefore the group professed Taliban-style fundamentalist Islam The organisation aims to spread Radical Islamist ideology to liberate the Kashmir, Afghanistan, Palestine & the rest of Islamic lands from the clutches of the enemies of Islam & enforce Sharia law in Muslim majority areas.

Activities in Bangladesh
In the 1990s, the training for these recruits was given in the hilly areas of Chittagong and Cox's Bazar.
Later on, members of the group made an attempt on the life of Shamsur Rahman, the liberal poet in January 1999. HuJi claimed responsibility for the 2001 Ramna Batamul bombings, which killed 10 people. A member of the suicide squad of HuJi also died. Committed to establishing an Islamic rule, HuJI was the prime suspect in a scheme to assassinate the Prime Minister of Bangladesh Sheikh Hasina in the year 2000. In October 2005, it was officially banned by the government of Bangladesh. The group has been condemned by Islamist groups such as the Hefazat-e-Islam Bangladesh.

Activities in India
Government of India has declared and banned it as a terrorist organisation.
In April 2006, the state police Special Task Force in India uncovered a plot by six HuJI terrorists, including the mastermind behind the 2006 Varanasi bombings, involving the destruction of two Hindu temples in the Indian city of Varanasi. Maps of their plans were recovered during their arrest. Huji has claimed responsibility for blasts at the Delhi High Court which claimed the lives of 10 and injured around 60. Vikar Ahmed, a member of an Islamist group, and connected to HuJI, has been accused of murdering police officers in Hyderabad. He is also a suspect in the Mecca Masjid bombing.

Harkat-ul-Jihad al-Islami has claimed responsibility for the 2011 Delhi bombing. However, this has not been confirmed by the National Investigation Agency.

14 people were killed and 94 people were injured in the bomb blast. Police have released two sketches of the suspects. Here is the Embedded video link for this latest attack. This link has English news video clip. This is in Hindi Language. Also as clear in the video links, they have also made threats to target other Indian cities.

Designation as a terrorist organisation
Countries and organisations below have officially listed Harkat-ul-Jihad al-Islami (HUJI) as a terrorist organisation.

On 6 August 2010, the United Nations designated Harakat-ul Jihad al-Islami as a foreign terror group and blacklisted its commander Ilyas Kashmiri. State Department counterterrorism coordinator Daniel Benjamin asserted that the actions taken demonstrated the global community's resolve to counter the group's threat. "The linkages between HUJI and Al-Qaeda are clear, and today's designations convey the operational relationship between these organizations," Benjamin said.

Militant attacks claimed by or attributed to HuJI

See also
 List of Deobandi organisations

References

External links
 Profile of HuJI-Bangladesh (HuJI-B)
 HuJI Profile on FAS.org

Organisations designated as terrorist by the United Kingdom
Jihadist groups in Bangladesh
Jihadist groups in Pakistan
Jihadist groups in India
Organisations designated as terrorist by India
Organizations based in Asia designated as terrorist
Organizations established in the 1990s
Deobandi organisations
Jihadist groups in Jammu and Kashmir
Organizations designated as terrorist by Israel
Organisations designated as terrorist by New Zealand
Organizations designated as terrorist by the United States